Samuel Bronson Cooper (May 30, 1850 – August 21, 1918) was a United States representative from Texas and a Member of the Board of General Appraisers.

Education and career

Born on May 30, 1850, near Eddyville in Caldwell County, Kentucky, Cooper moved to Texas with his family the same year and located in Woodville, Tyler County, Texas and attended the common schools. Cooper read law and was admitted to the bar in 1871. He entered private practice in Woodville from 1872 to 1885. He was prosecutor for Tyler County from 1876 to 1880. He was a member of the Texas Senate from 1881 to 1885. He was appointed the Collector of Internal Revenue for the First District of Texas in Galveston by President Grover Cleveland, serving from 1885 to 1888. He was an unsuccessful candidate for Texas district judge in 1888.

Congressional service

Cooper was elected as a Democrat to the United States House of Representatives of the 53rd United States Congress and to the five succeeding Congresses, serving from March 4, 1893, to March 3, 1905. He was an unsuccessful candidate for reelection to the 59th United States Congress. He was again elected to the 60th United States Congress and served from March 4, 1907, to March 3, 1909. He was an unsuccessful candidate for reelection to the 61st United States Congress.

Federal judicial service

Cooper was nominated by President William Howard Taft on May 16, 1910, to a seat on the Board of General Appraisers vacated by Marion De Vries. He was confirmed by the United States Senate on May 24, 1910, and received his commission on May 26, 1910. His service terminated on August 21, 1918, due to his death in New York City, New York. He was succeeded by George Emery Weller. He was interred in Magnolia Cemetery in Beaumont, Jefferson County, Texas.

Family

Cooper's daughter, Willie C. Cooper, was born in Woodville. At the age of sixteen she was graduated from the Texas Female College with first honors. Willie was the first wife of William P. Hobby.

References

Sources

 

1850 births
1918 deaths
People from Caldwell County, Kentucky
People from Woodville, Texas
Democratic Party Texas state senators
Members of the Board of General Appraisers
United States Article I federal judges appointed by William Howard Taft
20th-century American judges
Democratic Party members of the United States House of Representatives from Texas
19th-century American politicians
United States federal judges admitted to the practice of law by reading law